Netha Hussain is a doctor and Wikipedian known for her efforts to tackle the spread of misinformation in Wikipedia about the origin of the coronavirus.

Biography 
Hussain was born on 11 June 1990 in Kunnamangalam in the state of Kerala.

Career 
Hussain embarked in her Wikipedia career in 2010 when she was still at first-year medical student at the Calicut Medical College in Kozhikode. She pursued her higher studies in 2016 by joining the University of Gothenburg. She also worked as a blogger at Huffington Post until 2018. In 2020, she obtained her PhD in clinical neuroscience from the University of Gothenburg.

In mid 2020, she began focusing on creating and curating Wikipedia articles related to the COVID-19 pandemic in English, Malayalam and Swedish language editions. She has written nearly 30 articles on Wikipedia relating to COVID-19 including List of unproven methods against COVID-19 with the purpose of preventing the spread of misinformation about the pandemic in internet and social media platforms.

She also launched WikiProject in order to improve and expand the information regarding the topics about the efficacy of the COVID-19 vaccines and about the COVID-19 vaccine safety on Wikipedia.

She received the 2020 Women in Open Source Academic Award, recognising her contributions regarding disseminating and sharing medical knowledge and information in Wikipedia. She also received honorable special mention from the United Nations through its official Twitter handle in 2020. She received an honorable mention during the 2021 virtual Wikimania conference.

References

External links 
 

Living people
Swedish women scientists
Indian women scientists
Swedish women academics
Indian women academics
Swedish women neuroscientists
21st-century Swedish non-fiction writers
21st-century Swedish women writers
21st-century Indian non-fiction writers
21st-century Indian women writers
Indian biographers
Indian encyclopedists
Indian science writers
Indian Wikimedians
Wikipedia people
University of Gothenburg alumni
Indian emigrants to Sweden
People from Kozhikode
People from Kerala
1990 births